Advances in Electrical and Computer Engineering is a peer-reviewed scientific journal published by the Ștefan cel Mare University of Suceava since 2001. , the editor-in-chief is Adrian Graur. The journal covers research on all aspects of electrical and computer engineering. Extended versions of selected papers presented at the Development and Application Systems Conference are published in this journal.

Abstracting and indexing 
The journal is abstracted and indexed in:
Science Citation Index Expanded
Scopus
Inspec
ProQuest databases
EBSCO databases
According to the Journal Citation Reports, the journal has a 2018 impact factor of 0.650, and a 5 years impact factor of 0.639.

References

External links

Electrical and electronic engineering journals
English-language journals
Open access journals
Publications established in 2001